Loggia is an Italian surname.

In Italy, it occurs over the North and Sicily, with higher concentrations in the areas surrounding Turin, and in the areas between Agrigento and Butera, suggesting Sicilian origins.

Branches of the Loggia family can also be found in the Philippines and the United States.

People
Enrico La Loggia (born 1947), Italian politician
Robert Loggia (1930-2015), American actor

References